Eleonore Charlotte of Württemberg-Montbéliard (20 November 1656 in Horburg – April 1743 in Wrocław), was by marriage Duchess of Oels-Württemberg.

Life 
Charlotte Eleanor was a daughter of the Duke George II of Württemberg-Montbéliard (1626-1699) from his marriage to Anne (1624-1680), the daughter of Gaspard III de Coligny.

On 7 May 1672, she married in Oleśnica with Duke Silvius II Frederick of Württemberg-Oels.  The marriage remained childless.

In 1676, Charlotte Eleanor acquired the Lordship and town of Twardogóra and moved her residence there.  She expanded the town extensively at her own expense, and supported new inhabitants.  In 1688, she replaced the church by a larger one.  She obtained a tax exemption for the town's residents for 100 years from Emperor Leopold I.

In 1712, she had a legal dispute with Anna Sophia of Mecklenburg-Schwerin (1647-1726), the widowed Duches of Württemberg-Juliusburg.  She lost the case and had to transfer Twardogóra to Anna Sophia.

References 
Friedrich-Albert Zimmermann: Beyträge zur Beschreibung von Schlesien, p. 122

External links 
 http://www.gross-wartenberg.de/sukgw/s209.html
 http://www.powiat-olesnicki.pl/index.php?kat=218

House of Württemberg
1656 births
1743 deaths
17th-century German people
18th-century German people
Daughters of monarchs